Bhoj Reddy Engineering College for Women, established in 1997, is an engineering college for women located in Hyderabad, India.

Administration 
Bhoj Reddy is run by the voluntary group Sangam Laxmibai Vidyapeet with the aim of promoting female education.

See also 
Education in India
Literacy in India
List of institutions of higher education in Telangana

References

External links

Engineering colleges in Hyderabad, India
All India Council for Technical Education
Women's engineering colleges in India
Women's universities and colleges in Telangana
Educational institutions established in 1997
1997 establishments in Andhra Pradesh